Louiseville Airport  is located  southeast of Louiseville, Quebec, Canada.

References

Registered aerodromes in Mauricie
Louiseville